Trollebo IP  is a football stadium in Hallstahammar, Sweden  and the home stadium for the football team Hallstahammars SK.

References 

Football venues in Sweden